Johann Jakob Weilenmann (24 January 1819, St. Gallen - 8 June 1896, St. Gallen) was a Swiss mountaineer and Alpine writer.

Weilenmann accomplished many first ascents in the Alps, amongst which are:
 1859 - Muttler in the Samnaun Alps
 1861 - Fluchthorn in the Silvretta, with Franz Pöll, a guide from Galtür
 1862 - Ramolkogel and Weißer Kogel in the Ötztal Alps
 1863 - Helsenhorn in the Lepontine Alps
 1865 - Piz Buin in the Silvretta with Joseph Anton Specht and the guides Franz Pöll and Jakob Pfitschner
 1865 - Crast' Agüzza in the Bernina Range with Specht, Pöll and Pfitschner
 1865 - Mont Blanc de Cheilon in the Pennine Alps with Justin Felley

Bibliography
 1859 - Eine Ersteigung des Piz Linard im Unter-Engadin
 1859 - Berg- und Gletscher-Fahrten in den Hochalpen der Schweiz, with Heinrich Zellen-Horner, Melchior Ulrich and Gottlieb Samuel Studer
 1859 - Die Ersteigung des Monte Rosa und Monte Generoso, with Melchior Ulrich
 1866 - Im Adula-Gebirge
 1866 - Das Gepaatschjoch: aus dem Kauner-Thale über die Gepaatsch- und Vernagt-Ferner nach dem Rofenthale
 1868 - Die bäder von Bormio : Landschaftsbilder, bergfahrten und naturwissenschaftliche skizzen, with Gottfried Ludwig Theobald
 1868 - Die Bäder von Bormio und die sie umgebende Gebirgswelt, with Gottfried Theobald, Christian Gregor Brugger and Conrad Meyer-Ahrens
 1872 - Aus der Firnenwelt, gesammelte Schriften
 ? - Bergabenteuer in Rätikon, Verwall und Silvretta : auf den Höhenwegen vom Rheintal bis zum Engadin mit dem einsamen Bergwanderer des 19. Jahrhunderts,

Literature 
 Eduard Scherrer: J.J. Weilenmann. In: Jahrbuch des Schweizer Alpenklub, (32) 1896–1897, 183–202. 

1819 births
1896 deaths
Swiss mountain climbers
People from St. Gallen (city)
Swiss writers